Prithvi Theatre is one of Mumbai's best known theatres. It was built by Shashi Kapoor and his wife Jennifer Kapoor in memory of Prithviraj Kapoor, Shashi's father, who had dreamt of having a "home" for his repertory theatre company, Prithvi Theatres, belongs to the Kapoor family, one of the most influential actor and director families in Bollywood. Prithviraj Kapoor founded 'Prithvi Theatres', a travelling theatre company in 1944. The company ran for sixteen years. Ved Segan was the architect who designed and built the Theatre with the supervision of Jennifer Kapoor. Jennifer, (Trustee) supervised the building and running of the theatre until her death in 1984. In 1978 Prithvi Theatre opened in Juhu, Mumbai. Shashi Kapoor was the Managing Trustee, the daily affairs are looked after by Kunal Kapoor (Trustee) with a small but efficient team. Prithvi Theatre has shows every day of the year (closed Mondays), hosts an annual Summertime programme of workshops and plays for children, the Memorial Concert on 28 February, an annual Theatre Festival in November, and many partnership programmes promoting language, poetry, international cinema & documentaries, performing arts – which are free to the public.

History
Prithvi Theatre was founded in 1942, by Prithviraj Kapoor, as a travelling troupe with 150 members, which staged productions across India. Its maiden performance was Kalidasa's classic "Shakuntala". In subsequent years the theatre staged more than 2,600 plays such as "Deewar" (Wall), "Pathan" (a community comprising Hindus and Muslims of North India), "Ghaddar" (Traitor), "Aahuthi" (Offering), "Kalaakar" (Artist), "Paisa" (Money) and "Kisaan" (Farmer). Prithviraj starred as the lead actor in every show. His work in the Indian film industry funded the activities of the company 

Prithviraj Kapoor's youngest son Shashi Kapoor, who had trained as an actor and director in the Prithvi Theatres, married Jennifer Kendal, daughter of Laura and Geoffrey Kendal, and the leading actress of their theatre company, Shakespearana. Shashi and Jennifer toured with both their parent’s companies – Prithvi Theatres and Shakespeareana, and shared a deep passion for theatre, and a great respect for Prithviraj's dream for Indian theatre.

Re-emergence

Prithviraj Kapoor’s dream was to have a permanent place for his theatre company. In 1962 he managed to lease a plot of land in Juhu on which to create a theatre space. Unfortunately his ill-health and subsequent death in 1972 delayed his dream turning into reality.  The year he died the lease on the land expired and was offered on sale to his family. Shashi Kapoor and his wife Jennifer decided to make Prithviraj’s dream a reality by buying the land, and setting up the 'Shri Prithviraj Kapoor Memorial Trust & Research Foundation' in his memory with the intention of building a space to promote Hindi theatre and the performing arts.

Prithvi Theatre was inaugurated on 5 November 1978 in Mumbai. "Udhwastha Dharmashala", written by G P Deshpande, staged  by Naseeruddin Shah, Om Puri and Benjamin Gilani was Prithvi's first play. This was followed by a play by the Indian People's Theatre Association (IPTA), a political satire, "Bakri", directed by actor-director M. S. Sathyu.

Theatre in Mumbai at the time was dominated by amateur English theatre of South Mumbai, Gujarati farce and low-key Marathi theatre in Dadar. Hindi theatre was at an all-time low with few venues available. Prithvi Theatre offered Hindi theatre an affordable platform where new styles and forms could be experimented with, a new exciting venue for the performers, directors, writers of theatre in the city, and creating a new audience for the genre.

The theatre's fifth anniversary in 1983 was celebrated with a festival to showcase the best of Prithvi, an event considered a success with audience and critics alike. By now the Prithvi Café, attached to the Theatre had become a well known meeting place for artists and art lovers.

Jennifer Kapoor, the driving strength, mentor and inspiration of Prithvi Theatre died on 7 September 1984. The theatre was not allowed to close on the day of her death, and the ‘show went on’ in true theatre tradition. Jennifer and Shashi's eldest son, Kunal Kapoor, with the help of Feroz Abbas Khan, took over the running of the theatre, and held a month-long Festival in February 1985 showcasing theatre from all over India.   Ustad Zakir Hussain, of whom Jennifer was great fan, performed on her birthday, 28 February during the festival, along with Pandit Shivkumar Sharma. Ustad Zakir Hussain has continued to perform every year on this date at Prithvi – probably the only place where audience members can experience Indian classical music without amplification – in the classic style of a ‘baithak’ – as was traditionally performed.

In the 1990s, Jennifer’s daughter Sanjna Kapoor started to help her brother Kunal Kapoor in the running of the theatre and its various activities. Gradually, as she learned and grew with experience, she added a host of activities and workshops, ‘Prithvi Players’ and ‘Little Prithvi Players’ (Theatre for Children).

The Indian government issued a commemorative stamp in 1995 to mark 50 years of 'Prithvi Theatre'.  In 2006, its annual festival celebrated the birth centenary of Prithviraj Kapoor, and was titled, "Kala Desh ki Sewa mein" (Art in service of the Nation).

Prithvi Theatre continues to flourish, providing a home for new talent and source of inspiration to the theatre fraternity and audience with over 540 shows a year, Tuesday through Sunday.

References

Further reading

 Shashi Kapoor presents the Prithviwallahs, by Shashi Kapoor, Deepa Gahlot, Prithvi Theatre (Bombay, India). Roli Books, 2004. .

External links

 Prithvi Theatre Official Site
 Citation of the commemorative stamp issued in the Golden Jubilee Year of Prithvi Theatre
UNESCO: Mapping Cultural Diversity: Good Practices from Around the Globe, Prithvi Theatre on p56

Theatres in Mumbai
Arts organizations established in 1978